Xavier Gosé i Rovira (1876, Alcalá de Henares – 16 March 1915, Lleida) was a Catalan painter and illustrator who worked in the Art Nouveau and Art Déco styles.

Biography
His father was an agronomist and died when Xavier was only four years old. The family then returned to Barcelona, where he was enrolled at the Escola de la Llotja in 1894, and studied with Josep Lluís Pellicer. From 1895 to 1898, he provided illustrations for several well-known magazines including L'Esquella de la Torratxa. A frequent customer at Els Quatre Gats, he held an exhibition of his drawings there in 1899.

In 1900, he moved to Paris and, two years later, where he contributed as a caricaturist for two satirical magazines: Le Rire (The Laugh) and L'Assiette au Beurre (The Plate of Butter), while continuing to provide drawings for publications in Barcelona. He also contributed to the German Art Nouveau magazines Jugend and Simplicissimus. During these years, he also participated in several exhibitions throughout Spain and in Mexico, on the occasion of that country's centenary. In 1912, he participated in a major exhibition devoted to artists from Lleida Province and, the following year, his works were shown in Buenos Aires.

When World War I began to have its effects in Paris, he returned to Catalonia and died of tuberculosis shortly thereafter. That same year, a retrospective of his work was organized at the "Reial Cercle Artístic de Barcelona" and his paintings became the first major acquisition for the Museu d'Art Jaume Morera, which has also held retrospectives; one as recently as 2009.

References

Further reading 
 DDAA, La col·lecció Raimon Casellas (1992), Publicacions del MNAC/Museo del Prado  (Catalog of the exhibition held at the Palau Nacional de Montjuïc from 28 July to 20 September)
 Xavier Gosé [1876–1915] : el París de la Belle Époque : Exhibition catalog, Madrid, 13 July- 12 September 1999, Fundación Cultural MAPFRE Vida 
 Jesús Navarro Guitart, Xavier Gosé y el París elegante, Prensas Universitarias de Zaragoza 2012

External links 

 Ciudad de la Pintura: A large selection of works by Gosé, with brief biography.

1876 births
1915 deaths
People from Alcalá de Henares
Spanish painters
Spanish illustrators
Art Nouveau painters
20th-century deaths from tuberculosis
Tuberculosis deaths in Spain